NRMA (trading name of National Roads and Motorists' Association) is an Australian organisation offering roadside assistance, advocacy for motorists and road-users, motoring advice, car servicing, International Driving Permits, travel and other services in New South Wales and the Australian Capital Territory. It is a member-owned mutual company limited by guarantee. It was formed in 1920. The Headquarters is in Sydney Olympic Park, New South Wales, Australia.

Prior to 2000, the organisation offered mutual insurance but that business was demutualised and spun out as NRMA Insurance which is now part of Insurance Australia Group Limited (IAG). NRMA and NRMA Insurance are independent companies with an agreement to use the same brand and name but each company is responsible for distinguishing the difference between the two organisations.

Early history

National Roads Association 

The Australian National Roads Association, which would become the NRMA, was launched in 1920. Its original aim was not to provide road service or insurance, but to obtain "reasonable and just legislation" to fund and improve roads.
 
Planning and financing of main roads had fallen into chaos following the defeat of the Main Roads Bill in 1911. Subsequent attempts to create a board to oversee main roads and distribute funding had also failed. The 1919 Local Government Act left all decisions to local councils, where decisions were made "from the point of view of local utility." Through-routes and main roads were assigned a low priority.

Role of the RACA 
The Royal Automobile Club of Australia (RACA) had been campaigning for better roads since its creation. The club had initiated a Good Roads Association in 1912, and its work was supported by the newspapers, notably the Sydney Morning Herald.

The National Roads Association was to be a broader and stronger pressure group seeking the same ends, and it received full support from RACA. When the Association was formally established on 4 February 1920, its provisional committee included RACA President, WJ McKinney, and RACA's Roads and Tours committee chairman, DM Cooper. There was also AR Bluett, secretary of the Local Government Association, who  had held office with Cooper in the Goods Roads Association.

Creation of NRMA and continued RACA involvement 

John Christian Watson became NRA President in 1920 until his death in 1941. The National Roads Association restructured as the National Roads and Motorists' Association at the beginning of 1924. The aims of the NRMA were to "cover everything necessary for the advancement and protection of motorists in all circumstances," a goal strikingly similar to that of RACA. This positioned the NRMA as a competitor as much as collaborator, particularly when it began to employ its own road service "guides." These returned servicemen "of exemplary character" patrolled specific areas, including the popular beaches of Coogee, Bondi Beach and Bronte, or were based at congested spots on the roads out of the city where they could receive messages by phone or relayed by other motorists.

RACA and the NRMA continued, nevertheless, to work together on issues of shared concern, such as continued lobbying for better roads. They shared the same solicitor, Mac Abbott. In a joint initiative the Princes Highway was "blazed with a red colour trail." Strips of colour banded by white were painted on telegraph posts, fences and trees as part of a network of trails along State highways.

The NRMA attended a 1925 meeting convened by RACA on traffic regulations, prior to a government traffic conference. Together with other motoring lobby groups, including the Motor Traders Association and Newcastle Automobile Club, they resolved to draft suggested reforms. Particular concerns included the need for a special traffic court, and a change to the "plethora of danger signs" that had appeared in the streets, accompanied by "frequently incomprehensible signals of police" at intersections. As an alternative to the red triangle placed by police at danger spots, the NRMA favoured (and sponsored) the highway lighthouse, a beacon powered by acetylene that could flash for as long as four months without maintenance.

Launch of NRMA Insurance 

By 1925, NRMA had 7,637 members, nearly double the previous year's. In that year NRMA formed NRMA Insurance, which also became a sub-agency of Lloyd's of London, and offered household policies in addition to motoring insurance.

NRMA Insurance now offers a range of insurance in New South Wales, Queensland, South Australia, Western Australia, the Northern Territory, the Australian Capital Territory and Tasmania, including car insurance, motorcycle insurance, home insurance, business insurance, travel insurance, boat insurance, caravan insurance and life insurance, landlord insurance, income protection insurance, bicycle insurance, and comprehensive car insurance.

MyNRMA 

NRMA is a member-owned mutual organisation offering additional resources to its members and customers. In 2018 MyNRMA provided roadside assistance to over 2.6 million members across NSW and the ACT. This includes exclusive member discounts on products and services including New South Wales roadside assistance, car servicing, car loans, driver training, batteries, and windscreen replacement.

Cessation of RACA 

Due the worldwide financial crises of the early 20th century it was apparent to both the NRMA and RACA that the two organisations were pursuing similar goals and duplicating services that might be combined. According to NRMA records, it was RACA that approached the NRMA regarding a merger. The NRMA went as far as examining RACA's books, but its Council voted against the merger. RACA subsequently rejected affiliation proposals put by the NRMA.

In 1939, the NRMA had 66,234 members and a huge road service operation. When the war in Europe began, it made a £10,000 donation to Australia's war effort, and followed RACA's early lead in forming the NRMA Transport Auxiliary. This force of 500 owner-drivers would provide rapid troop transport if required. Staff member, Miss K. Broadbent, organised a Women's Auxiliary Transport Corps and successfully trained 506 women to handle trucks, lorries, ambulances and motor cycles.

RACA and the NRMA were both involved in information campaigns during the war, including the discouragement of petrol hoarding, considered both unpatriotic and dangerous. After the war, lobbying by the NRMA, RACA and affiliates in other States had a direct effect on the 1949 Coalition Government's promises to end petrol rationing and give a better deal on road grants and petrol tax.

At the end of the war, RACA took the decision to cease its road service operations. The NRMA's growth had made its competing operations considerably wider in scope and reach. RACA's members were better served by an agreement concluded with the NRMA whereby RACA membership included entitlement to full NRMA services, an arrangement that still exists today. For many years, an NRMA officer was based full-time at the RACA Club House.

Recent History

Growth

The 1950s heralded the beginning of a huge surge in the number of cars on Australian roads, and NRMA membership increased in kind. It hit one million members in the 1970s, and by the late 1980s that number had doubled. To ensure the fleet of NRMA Patrols could find their members they adopted new technologies at the time like the two-way radio and the latest Holden panel vans.

Demutualisation

NRMA's financial success resulted in a huge accumulation of surplus funds. Competing interests to control such sizeable assets led to board conflicts. In 1994, conflict on the NRMA Board was described by an independent report as "of such magnitude and nature that it is debilitating to the organisation and potentially destructive." These issues led to the proposal of demutualisation whereby members would exchange membership rights for shares in a listed company. The proposal anticipated and then rode the wave of demutualisations that swept Australia in the 1990s, following changes to company laws that facilitated demutualisations.

NRMA Insurance's financial success had led to a huge accumulation of surplus funds which could not be distributed back to members and was attractive to outside interests. Insurance premium rebates to members had the effect of artificially and harmfully deflating the price for NRMA's insurance products. Demutualisation would allow funds to be distributed to members without affecting longer term product pricing.

It was argued that demutualisation would also address perceived corporate governance issues that centred on the board conflict. For example, institutional shareholders (who out of necessity would become significant owners of the large, newly listed company) would likely enforce a greater level of rigour and discipline on the board of directors.. However, demutualisation would give away control from members to institutional investors, with the result that motorists' interests would have less representation in governance than profit motivation. Member concerns centred on possible increases in insurance premiums and road service fees and decreases in service quality brought about by a profit-oriented company.

An initial demutualisation attempt, promoted as “Share the future,” proposed demutualisation of the entire organisation including both the insurance/financial services and road service companies. This proposal initially received member approval but was overturned by the Federal Court of Australia which found that the information material distributed to members was "misleading and deceptive." The successful court challenge was mounted by some of the board's directors (Fraser v NRMA Holdings Ltd (1995) 127 ALR 543).

After years of discussion and acrimony, NRMA Insurance Limited was demutualised in August 2000 and was separated from the National Roads and Motorists' Association Limited. NRMA Insurance Limited later changed its name to Insurance Australia Group Limited.

Separate Paths

NRMA remains a mutual company owned by its members. 
Insurance Australia Group Limited is a listed company owned by its shareholders. It has a number of operating subsidiaries using the NRMA brand, including NRMA Insurance Limited, as well as a number of other insurance and related brands.

During 2004–2005, NRMA, in a joint venture agreement with JF Meridian Trust, acquired the Travelodge Hotel Group chain of hotels in Australia.

In September 2006, NRMA acquired 75% of the car rental company Thrifty Australia from troubled Mitsubishi Motors Australia Limited in a multimillion-dollar deal, however the deal was highlighted in the media and in NSW Parliament as potentially involving conflict of interest with the board member Gary Punch. In 2008, Thrifty became a wholly owned subsidiary of NRMA Motoring and Services.
In June 2021, it was announced that Thrifty is being disposed of by NRMA. 

The NRMA now franchise SIXT in Australia. SIXT are an international car hire agency, first founded in Germany in  1912. Today, they have operations on 6 continents. 

It has also continued to grow its travel and holiday operations by investing in tourist parks, and in January 2007, acquired a major stake in the travel wholesaler Adventure World.

Awards

NRMA won the Australian Business Awards (ABA) for Service Excellence for the seventh year in a row in 2015. The same year, it also won the ABA award for Community Involvement for the first time. It has also previously won the ABA Award for Innovation, recognising NRMA's contribution to industry and to its Members by introducing new and beneficial technologies, ideas and processes.

Education and Charity support

NRMA has well-established road safety programs aimed at all age demographics from older road users to young children. NRMA provides free resources to help schools teach road safety and each year its touring school programs educate over 50,000 students.

NRMA is involved in several community programs, such as servicing the vehicles of drought-stricken farmers through Frontier Services' Farm Rescue Outback Links program and helping vulnerable Australians obtain their driver's licence to access employment. All NRMA employees can use volunteer leave to help in the community alongside NRMA members.

Environment

The NRMA operates one of the largest private vehicle fleets in NSW with over 400 Patrol vans and other vehicles. In 2006, the company developed a mandate to convert the Patrol fleet to LPG to save cost and reduce its environmental impact. The LPG conversion led to a 25% reduction of the NRMA's Roadside Assistance fleet emissions and lower toxic emissions.

The company has continued to innovate with its fleet to improve productivity, safety and reduce carbon emissions. Taking a fit for purpose approach, the NRMA has developed a new design for Patrol vehicles for greater functionality and safety. It has also lightweight equipment and incorporated other measures such as LED lights to save costs and reduce carbon emissions. The NRMA continues to explore real-time driver feedback to help reduce fuel and promote safety.

The NRMA committed to going carbon-neutral by 2020. In 2016, this stood at 51% reduction after energy efficiency programs and offsetting corporate fleet emissions. The organisation is focused on future proofing its buildings to improve office energy efficiency and reduce  emissions and costs. The NRMA has also started rolling out solar power at its car servicing locations.

EV 
In 2023 NRMA introduced two trial mobile charging vans. 

In 2012 the NRMA opened free public charging stations for electric vehicles in Sydney (fast charger) and Canberra, the first in a network that will help this emerging market to grow. Also undertook electric vehicle roadshows to help raise awareness and trialled one of the first to market electric vehicles as a roadside assistance vehicle.

The NRMA's car hire agency, SIXT, are also a leader in Australia championing electric vehicle hire.

Publications 
NRMA published a monthly magazine called "Open Road".

Criticism

In 2008 the NRMA was criticised for its anti-cycleway stance. The Sydney Lord Mayor, Clover Moore, said the NRMA, like big petroleum companies, has a vested interest in campaigning for car use. Greens MP Lee Rhiannon said the NRMA has an anti-cycleway agenda. Said Rhiannon: "The NRMA's anti-cycleway campaign is a crude attempt to boost money for road building. It's time the NRMA leadership came into the 21st century and recognised that encouraging more cyclists is an easy way to reduce road congestion." Rhiannon accused the NRMA of using misleading statistics in its campaign.

Advocacy
The NRMA advocates for improving road safety, reducing the cost of motoring and ensuring a better road and public transport network for all. In 1982, the NRMA worked with the NSW Government to improve road safety by introducing random breath testing, and in 2012 NRMA was responsible for ensuring that all revenue raised by speed and red-light cameras is reinvested back into the road network.

Thousands of members have taken part in the NRMA's annual Seeing Red on Roads and Seeing Red on Rail surveys,  marking the roads and train stations that frustrate them the most. In 2014, the NRMA launched its online advocacy platform, Speak Out, giving members the chance to get involved in its advocacy work by suggesting and voting on campaign ideas, signing petitions and asking questions of NRMA subject matter experts.

In recent years, NRMA's advocacy has led to significant reforms, including:
 Fuel price transparency legislation in NSW, forcing petrol stations to provide real time fuel information to motorists;
 Improved speed awareness signage and high visibility markings at mobile speed camera locations;
 Mandatory alcohol interlock devices for repeat drink drive offenders to reduce the number of drink drive offences committed;
 Increased fines and the loss of a demerit point for those who illegally park in disabled parking spaces;
 The recall of dangerous and hard-to-read ‘bright lights’ coloured number plates from NSW roads; and
 Record infrastructure investment in major road projects, including the full duplication of the Pacific Highway, improving road safety and reducing congestion.

The Open Road magazine
NRMA launched The Open Road more than 90 years ago to inform its members about its activities, including campaigning governments for improved roads, road safety and information about motoring. It was launched in 1921 under the name Good Roads and was renamed The Open Road in 1927. The Open Road continues to inform NRMA members about all things motoring, including car reviews, road rules and the work of NRMA in lobbying governments for a better deal for motorists. It also includes content reflecting NRMA's other services for members such as travel, Safer Driving School, special member deals and roadside service.

References

External links

My NRMA
NRMA Insurance

Financial services companies established in 1920
Automobile associations in Australia
Insurance companies of Australia
1920 establishments in Australia
Transport in New South Wales
Emergency road services